Karim Belhocine (born 2 April 1978) is a French football coach and a former player who played as a midfielder. He is currently unemployed after most recently managing Belgian club Kortrijk.

Early life
Belhocine was born in Vénissieux, France, to Algerian parents. His father is from Lakhdaria, while his mother is from Akbou.

Playing career
Belhocine previously played for the Belgian side RE Virton, the Portuguese club S.C. Espinho, as well as the French amateur clubs US Forbach and Trélissac . On 8 May 2008, he joined K.V. Kortrijk, which gained promotion to the Belgian First Division, on a free transfer from Virton.

On 19 July 2011, Belhocine signed a two-year contract with Belgian Pro League side Standard Liège.

Coaching career
On 12 October 2021, he returned to Kortrijk as a manager.

Managerial Statistics

Honours

Club
K.A.A. Gent
 Belgian Pro League: 2014–15

References

1978 births
Living people
People from Vénissieux
Association football midfielders
Belgian Pro League players
Expatriate footballers in Belgium
Expatriate footballers in Portugal
French expatriate sportspeople in Belgium
French footballers
French people of Kabyle descent
French sportspeople of Algerian descent
AS Saint-Priest players
K.V. Kortrijk players
R.E. Virton players
Standard Liège players
S.K. Beveren players
K.A.A. Gent players
Kabyle people
Trélissac FC players
French football managers
K.V. Kortrijk managers
R.S.C. Anderlecht managers
R. Charleroi S.C. managers
Belgian Pro League managers
French expatriate football managers
Expatriate football managers in Belgium
Sportspeople from Lyon Metropolis
Footballers from Auvergne-Rhône-Alpes